A census locality in Scotland is a reporting district for results from the 2001 census corresponding to all or part of an urban area.

City of Aberdeen 

Aberdeen Settlement.

Aberdeenshire

Angus 

Montrose Settlement.

Argyll and Bute 

Dunoon Settlement.
Helensburgh Settlement.

Clackmannanshire 

Alloa Settlement.
Tillicoultry Settlement.

Dumfries and Galloway

City of Dundee

East Ayrshire 

Galston-Newmilns Settlement.

East Dunbartonshire 

Greater Glasgow Settlement.
Kirkintilloch-Lenzie Settlement.

East Lothian 

Edinburgh Settlement.

East Renfrewshire 

Greater Glasgow Settlement.

City of Edinburgh 

Edinburgh Settlement.

Eileanan Siar 

Coll Settlement.
Stornoway Settlement.

Falkirk 

Banknock-Haggs Settlement.
Bonnybridge Settlement.
Falkirk Settlement.

Fife 

Anstruther-Pittenweem Settlement.
Buckhaven Settlement.
Glenrothes Settlement.
Cowdenbeath Settlement.
Halbeath-Crossgates Settlement.
Inverkeithing-Dalgety Bay Settlement.
Leuchars Settlement.
Kennoway Settlement.

City of Glasgow 

Greater Glasgow Settlement.

Highland 

Culloden Settlement.
Inverness Settlement.

Inverclyde 

Greenock Settlement.

Midlothian 

 Dalkeith Settlement

Moray

North Ayrshire 

 Ardrossan Settlement.
 Irvine Settlement.

North Lanarkshire 

Greater Glasgow Settlement.
Kirkintilloch-Lenzie Settlement.
Chryston Settlement.
Overtown-Gowkthrapple Settlement.

Orkney Islands

Perth and Kinross

Renfrewshire 

Greater Glasgow Settlement.
Erskine Settlement.

South Ayrshire 

Ayr-Prestwick Settlement.

South Lanarkshire 

Larkhall
Blantyre | Hamilton
Greater Glasgow

Scottish Borders

Shetland Islands

Stirling 

Stirling Settlement.

West Dunbartonshire 

Dumbarton Settlement.
Greater Glasgow Settlement.

West Lothian 

Stoneyburn-Addiebrownhill Settlement.
Livingston Settlement.

See also
Demography of Scotland
United Kingdom Census 2001
United Kingdom Census 2011

Demographics of Scotland
Administrative divisions of Scotland
Census